Chehere: A Modern Day Classic, is a 2015 psychological thriller Bollywood film written and directed by Rohit Kaushik. Chehere stands for "faces" in English. The film stars Jackie Shroff, Manisha Koirala, Gulshan Grover, Divya Dutta, Hrishita Bhatt, Aarya Babbar, Bob Brahmbhatt, Rakesh Bedi, and Geeta Vij. Chehere released on 28 August 2015.

Plot
Chehere is a period drama set in the 1950s that revolves around the life of a retired silent era actor played by Manisha Koirala. The actress in the film has a bitter relationship with her sister (played by Divya Dutta), a poet. There is clash of ideas and perspectives and what follows is mystery.

Cast
Jackie Shroff
Manisha Koirala
Gulshan Grover
Divya Dutta
Hrishita Bhatt
Aarya Babbar
Bob Brahmbhatt
Rakesh Bedi
Geeta Vij

Soundtrack

References

External links
 
Chehere at SeekRed

2015 films
2010s Hindi-language films
Films set in the 1950s
Films set in Mumbai